Tangalan National High School or TNHS is a public secondary school in Tangalan, Aklan, Philippines. Formerly known as Tangalan Community High School it was then changed into a national high school on June 10, 1983 via National Law No. 441.

Sports
The school actively participates in the municipal meets. The winners then proceed to the Cluster Meets (athletic event for the three municipalities of Ibajay, Tangalan and Makato) and to the Provincial Meet. The school has also sent student-athletes to the regional meet the Western Visayas Athletic Association (WVRAA) Meet. This is the annual athletic event for the whole Western Visayas. The school becomes part of the delegation of the province of Aklan.

The school also participates in the Palarong Pambansa, the athletic event for the whole country. The student-athletes of the school who have qualified in the regional meet becomes part of the delegates of Western Visayas. The school have recently won bronze in the Palarong Pambansa in the javelin throw event courtesy of Jerremay Rubias.

Notable people

Alumni and faculty
 Most Rev. Jose Corazon T. Talaoc, D.D. – former Bishop of Romblon (11 Jun 2003 appointed); presently Bishop of Aklan (25 May 2011 appointed). and current bishop of Aklan.
 Jerremay Rubias – Javelin throw Gold Medalist (2013 Palarong Pambansa), and Bronze Medalist (2014 Palarong Pambansa).

See also
 List of schools in Tangalan
 Education in the Philippines

References

External links
 DepEd Region VI Website
 Data.gov Website
 Teacher Angel's Internship Experience

Schools in Aklan